Arne Boman (born 15 January 1931) is a retired Swedish ice hockey player. Boman was part of the Djurgården Swedish champions' team of 1958.

References

1931 births
Djurgårdens IF Hockey players
Living people
Swedish ice hockey players